Magnetic resonance imaging burn (also known as an "MRI burn") is a cutaneous condition characterized by first-, second- or third-degree burns due to metal or wire contact with skin, creating a closed-loop conduction system.

See also 
 List of cutaneous conditions

References 

Burns